Mount Darby is a mountain rising to  on the divide between Rhone Glacier and Matterhorn Glacier in the Asgard Range, Victoria Land. It was named by the New Zealand Geographic Board (1998) after Marie Darby, a marine biologist of the Canterbury Museum, Christchurch; her January 1968 voyage to McMurdo Sound in the Magga Dan marks the first visit of a New Zealand woman scientist to Antarctica.

References
 

Mountains of the Asgard Range
Scott Coast